6th arrondissement may refer to:
 6th arrondissement of Lyon
 6th arrondissement of Marseille
 6th arrondissement of Paris
6th arrondissement of the Littoral Department, Benin

Arrondissement name disambiguation pages